The Independent Farmers were a short-lived political party in Iceland in 1916.

History
The party was established in 1916 as a breakaway from the Farmers' Party. In the August 1916 elections to the six previously appointed seats in the upper house of the Althing, the party finished third with 22% of the vote. However, by the October elections to both houses, its vote share had fallen to just 4%, with the party winning just one seat in each of the houses. Following the elections it merged with the Farmers' Party to form the Progressive Party.

References

Defunct political parties in Iceland
Political parties established in 1916
Political parties disestablished in 1916
Nordic agrarian parties